Lee Soo-hyuk  (born Lee Hyuk-soo on May 31, 1988) is a South Korean model and actor.

Life and career 
Born Lee Hyuk-soo, he debuted as a model in designer Jung Wook-jun's Lone Costume fashion show in 2006. He walked down the runways of the nation's famous fashion brands including General Idea and Song Zio, and did cover shoots for several renowned fashion magazines such as GQ, Bazaar and Elle. 

After appearing in music videos of girl groups Gavy NJ and 2NE1 in 2009 and 2010, he expanded his career into acting. Using the stage name Lee Soo-hyuk, his credits include the television series White Christmas (2011), What's Up (2011), Vampire Idol (2011-2012) and Shark (2013). 
He also appeared in the films The Boy from Ipanema (2010), Runway Cop (2012), and Horror Stories 2 (2013).

In 2013, he went to Europe for Paris Fashion Week and London Fashion Week, where he walked catwalks for numerous fashion runway shows such as Balenciaga, J.W. Anderson, and Balmain.  He was also named one of the "13 Top Breakout New Male Faces of F/W2013" in the online fashion magazine "Style Minutes", being the only Asian model to make the cut among other newbies from Holland, Canada, Brazil, Australia, England, Hungary, Germany and Lithuania.

In 2014, he was a guest judge in the 4th season of Korea's Next Top Model, and was also invited by Tyra Banks to participate in the 21st season's finale of America's Next Top Model. That same year, Lee signed with Star J Entertainment, leaving his former agency SidusHQ. He then starred as the second male lead in the cable romantic comedy series High School King of Savvy and Righteous Love (both from tvN). In 2015, Lee was cast in the period vampire romance Scholar Who Walks the Night, based on the webtoon of the same title. In 2016, Lee played secondary roles in OCN's espionage drama Local Hero, MBC's romantic comedies Lucky Romance and Sweet Stranger and Me.

In March 2017, Lee joined YG Entertainment.<ref>{{cite web|last1=Kim|first1=Kyung-ju|date=3 March 2017|title=[공식입장]이수혁, YG 품으로..절친 지드래곤과 한솥밥|url=http://osen.mt.co.kr/article/G1110595629|access-date=2017-03-03|website=Osen|language=ko}}</ref>

In 2019, Lee was cast in the crime thriller film Pipeline by Yoo Ha.

In 2020, Lee was cast in the mystery romance drama Born Again alongside Jang Ki-yong and Jin Se-yeon. He was also the main male lead in the mini web series Handmade Love. 

Lee then co-starred in the tvN fantasy-romance drama Doom At Your Service in 2021 and MBC fantasy drama Tomorrow'' in 2022.

Personal life 
On August 10, 2017 Lee began his mandatory military service. After the basic military training, he continued his service as a public service officer for two years.

Other ventures

Endorsements 
Lee Soo Hyuk represents numerous global brands such as Adidas, Bulgari

In 2020, he was selected as the new model for the skincare brand Nivea Men.

He is still often booked for fashion editorials in magazines such as GQ, Elle, Harpars Bazaar, W, Esquire. In 2020, he did fashion editorials for Dior Homme, Balenciaga, and other labels.

In 2021, he became the exclusive face of the fashion brand Fahrenheit.

Filmography

Film

Television series

Web series

Television shows

Music video appearances

Awards and nominations

Other accolades

Listicles

References

External links 
 

South Korean male film actors
South Korean male television actors
South Korean male models
1988 births
IHQ (company) artists
Living people
YG Entertainment artists